Ryerson Station State Park is a  Pennsylvania state park in Richhill Township, Greene County, Pennsylvania in the United States. It was previously home to Ronald J. Duke Lake, a  artificial lake on the North Fork of the Dunkard Fork of Wheeling Creek, that was constructed in 1960, but drained in 2005 due to structural concerns about the dam.

History
The park is named for Fort Ryerson. This fort was constructed by the Commonwealth of Virginia in 1792 to resist the raids of local Native Americans who fought against the settlement of the Ohio River Valley by the United States. Ownership of the land in this part of Pennsylvania was disputed among several parties including Virginia, Pennsylvania and the Native Americans.

The state acquired the land in 1958. Duke Lake was completed with the construction of a dam in 1960 and finally the park was opened in 1967.

Recreation
There is a camping facility on a ridge overlooking the park. There are 48 sites for tents and travel trailers, with flush toilets and warm showers at the camp site, plus some sites with electricity. Group tenting is permitted in the large group tenting area. Two wooden cottages are available for rent. The cottages have electric lights and outlets as well as double and single bunks that sleep up to five, wooden floors, windows, skylights, a porch, fire ring, and picnic table.

Over 275 picnic tables are available for use on the ground of Ryerson Station State Park. The park also has five pavilions. There is a small playground in the main picnic area.

Hunters are expected to follow the rules and regulations of the Pennsylvania Game Commission. The common game species are ruffed grouse, eastern gray squirrels, wild turkey and white-tailed deer. The hunting of groundhogs is prohibited.

Duke Lake had been stocked by the Pennsylvania Fish and Boat Commission with trout in the spring and again in the fall. Non-powered and electric powered boats with current registration from any state and having a launching or mooring permit from the Pennsylvania Fish and Boat Commission had been permitted onto the waters of the lake. Gasoline powered boats were prohibited.

In July 2005, Duke Lake was drawn down due to concerns about the structural integrity of the dam across the North Fork of the Dunkard Fork of Wheeling Creek. As of March 2012, the lake bed remains dry.

Structural cracks in the Duke Lake Dam are reported to be the result of longwall mining.

The dam had been scheduled to be rebuilt by 2017 in a deal with Consol Energy that allowed the company to refrain from admitting fault for the original damage, continue mining under the park, and begin drilling for natural gas under the park in the future. However, due to the ground's mining-related instability, the rebuild was abandoned in 2015.

The swimming pool is open from 11:00 am until 7:00 pm beginning Memorial Day weekend and ending Labor Day weekend. The park has  of hiking trails. The trails pass through several different habitats, mature forests, evergreen plantations, wet valley bottoms and fields.

The snow-covered slopes of the park are opened to sledding and tobogganing when the weather permits. Duke Lake is open for ice fishing and ice skating. Fish and skate at your own risk as the thickness of the ice is not monitored by the park staff. Cross-country skiing and snowmobiling are permitted on some of the hiking trails.

Nearby state parks
The following state park is within  of Ryerson Station State Park:

Prickett's Fort State Park (West Virginia)
Hillman State Park (Washington County)

References

External links

  

State parks of Pennsylvania
Protected areas established in 1967
Parks in Greene County, Pennsylvania
Protected areas of Greene County, Pennsylvania